Najmabad (also Romanized as Najmābād) is a village in Robat Rural District, in the Central District of Sabzevar County, Razavi Khorasan Province, Iran. At the 2016 census, its population was 488, in 118 families.

References 

Populated places in Sabzevar County